= Jennifer Sarvary Bradford =

American political scientist

- Occupations: United Nations Corruption and Economic Crime Branch
- Known for: gender equality and anti-corruption efforts in Africa

Jennifer Sarvary Bradford is a Sweden-American lawyer and policy analyst who has served on the United Nations Office on Drugs and Crime (UNODC) Corruption and Economic Crime Branch since 2013. Bradford's work has aimed at quantifying and analyzing gender and corruption issues primarily on the African continent, resulting in the publication The Time is Now - Addressing the gender dimensions of corruption. She was recently named co-ordinator of UNODC's anti-corruption work in Africa.

Bradford has worked at the United Nations since 1998 in multiple duty stations, including New York, Democratic Republic of the Congo office and in Addis Ababa
